Claire Conner McCaskill (born July 24, 1953) is an American politician who served as a United States Senator from Missouri from 2007 to 2019 and as State Auditor of Missouri from 1999 to 2007.

McCaskill is a native of Rolla, Missouri. She graduated from the University of Missouri and the University of Missouri School of Law. A member of the Democratic Party, McCaskill served as a member of the Missouri House of Representatives from 1983 to 1989, as Jackson County Prosecutor from 1993 to 1998, and as the 34th State Auditor of Missouri from 1999 to 2007. She ran for Governor of Missouri in the 2004 election, defeating Democratic incumbent Bob Holden in the Democratic primary and losing to Republican Matt Blunt in a close general election.

McCaskill was elected to the U.S. Senate in 2006. While the 2nd female senator to have represented Missouri, she is the 1st female candidate elected to the  Senate from Missouri. (Jean Carnahan was appointed upon the death of her husband.) Re-elected in 2012, McCaskill was defeated in 2018 by Republican challenger Josh Hawley. , McCaskill is a political analyst for MSNBC and NBC and a visiting fellow at the University of Chicago Institute of Politics.

Early life, education and early law career
McCaskill was born in Rolla, Missouri. Her father, William Young McCaskill (1925–1993), served as a state Insurance Commissioner during the administration of Governor Warren E. Hearnes. Her mother, Betty Anne (née Ward; 1928–2012), was the first woman elected to the city council of Columbia, Missouri. Betty Anne McCaskill lost a race for a seat in the state House of Representatives to Leroy Blunt, the father of U.S. Senator Roy Blunt and grandfather of former Missouri Governor Matt Blunt.

McCaskill spent her early childhood in the small Missouri town of Houston, later moving to Lebanon, and eventually Columbia. She attended David H. Hickman High School in Columbia, where she was a cheerleader, Pep Club president, a member of the debate club, a musical cast member, and homecoming queen. While attending the University of Missouri, McCaskill joined Kappa Alpha Theta sorority, graduating in 1975 with a B.A. in political science. She received her Juris Doctor (J.D.) from the University of Missouri School of Law in 1978. In the summer of 1974, before graduating from the University of Missouri, McCaskill studied at the Institute on Comparative Political and Economic Systems at Georgetown University.

From the time she graduated from law school in 1978 until her exit from the U.S. Senate in January 2019, McCaskill spent all but three years of her professional career in the public sector. The exception is the three years she spent in private practice as an attorney in a Kansas City law firm (1989 to 1991). Following her graduation from law school, she spent one year as a law clerk on the Missouri Court of Appeals for the Western District, which sits in Kansas City. Thereafter, McCaskill joined the Jackson County prosecutor's office, where she specialized in arson cases.

Early political career

State legislature
In 1982, McCaskill was elected to represent the Brookside neighborhood of Kansas City in the Missouri House of Representatives. She left the State House and contemplated running for Jackson County Prosecutor in 1988, but did not pursue the position when her mentor, fellow Democrat and incumbent Prosecutor Albert Riederer decided to seek another term.

County politics
In 1990, McCaskill was elected to the Jackson County Legislature (the equivalent of a county commission or county council).

In February 1991, she testified in favor of a Missouri Senate bill that would prohibit a man accused of raping his wife from using marriage as a defense. "This is simply an issue of fundamental justice. It's embarrassing that we live in a state where it's okay to rape your wife", McCaskill said.

In December 1991, McCaskill announced her intention to run for county prosecutor. At the time of the announcement, Riederer had not announced whether he was going to seek reelection. McCaskill said that crime had "run amok" during Riederer's eleven years as county prosecutor. McCaskill won the Democratic primary, and she went on to win the 1992 general election with 53 percent of the vote. McCaskill was the first woman to serve as prosecutor for Jackson County. She was reelected in 1996 with 71 percent of the vote.

State Auditor

In 1998, McCaskill was elected as State Auditor with 50.3 percent of the vote in the general election. She was the second female to hold the post, the first having been her immediate predecessor, Margaret B. Kelly.

When McCaskill ran for reelection in 2002, the winner of the Republican Party primary was Al Hanson, who had previously been incarcerated for fraud. Hanson said he was qualified to detect fraud because he had committed fraud himself. Because of Hanson's history, the leader of the Missouri Republican Party urged voters not to vote for Hanson in the general election. McCaskill was reelected with 60 percent of the vote.

2004 gubernatorial campaign

On August 3, 2004, McCaskill defeated incumbent Governor Bob Holden in the Democratic primary, becoming the first candidate to defeat an incumbent Governor in a primary election in state history.

On November 2, 2004, McCaskill lost to her Republican opponent, then-Secretary of State Matt Blunt in the general election by a margin of 51% to 48%. McCaskill's loss to Blunt was the first defeat in her twenty-year political career.

U.S. Senate

Elections

2006

Both incumbent Jim Talent and McCaskill easily defeated their opponents in their respective primaries on August 8, 2006. McCaskill and Talent debated each other on Meet the Press on October 8, 2006. On November 8, 2006, McCaskill defeated Talent by a margin of 49.6% to 47.3% with two minor-party candidates taking the remainder.

2012

McCaskill ran unopposed in the Democratic primary and faced Republican nominee Todd Akin in the general election. Until mid-August, polling showed them running neck and neck. Then, in a television interview on August 12, Akin claimed that women who were the victims of what he described as "legitimate rape" rarely ended up pregnant. His comments caused controversy and he was criticized by members of both parties. He faced calls to withdraw from the race but did not do so, and McCaskill opened up an increasing lead in opinion polls. Akin's comments caused a backlash among voters, particularly women, and McCaskill was re-elected with 54.7% of the vote to his 39.2%.

In August 2015, McCaskill penned a Politico article describing how she indirectly helped Akin—who she believed would make a weak general election candidate—win the Republican primary. Specifically, her campaign ran ads during primary season criticizing Akin as being too conservative; McCaskill did this to encourage conservatives (via reverse psychology) to vote for Akin. Washington Post contributor Jonathan Adler and others questioned whether McCaskill's indirect coordination with the Akin campaign constituted an unreported and in-kind contribution to Akin's campaign in violation of federal election law.

2018

McCaskill announced she was running for her third term. As of January 2018, six declared Democratic opponents, and five Republicans, including poll leader state Attorney General Josh Hawley, were declared candidates for the GOP primary. On July 27, The Daily Beast reported that Microsoft had discovered that in September 2017, GRU "Fancy Bear" hackers had attempted spoofing hacks of her staff aides' email in an attempt to target her candidacy efforts, on behalf of the Russian state. Less than three weeks before the November general election, conservative group Project Veritas released secretly recorded video footage of statements by McCaskill and her campaign staff that appeared to differ from their public stances on several issues. In response, McCaskill said she has been "very upfront about all my positions", and called on Republican opponent Hawley to launch an investigation into whether state laws were violated in capturing and publishing the footage. On election day, Hawley received 51.5% of the vote, to McCaskill's 45.5%. She has said that one of the reasons she lost was her party's lack of reach to rural Americans.

Tenure

McCaskill was the first elected woman to represent Missouri in the U.S. Senate. Jean Carnahan was appointed to the Senate following her husband's death and posthumous election, but was defeated in a close election by Jim Talent.
In 2006, McCaskill defeated Talent for a full term.
In 2011, she became Missouri's senior Senator when Roy Blunt took office as the junior Senator.

Political positions
Through 2012, McCaskill was named by the National Journal as one of the ten most "moderate" Senators. In 2011, she was ranked 50th on its scale of the 100 senators, from most liberal to most conservative. In 2013, the National Journal rated McCaskill's voting record as 53% liberal and 47% conservative. The Washington Post reported in 2012 that she was the second-most-likely Democratic Senator to vote against her party. The conservative Americans for Prosperity gave her a 30% score for being in line with their positions in 2016. The progressive Americans for Democratic Action gave her a 65% liberal quotient in 2015. As of 2018, FiveThirtyEight, which tracks Congressional votes, found that McCaskill voted with President Donald Trump's position 45% of the time.

2008 presidential election

In January 2008, McCaskill endorsed then-Senator Barack Obama in his campaign for the Democratic nomination for president, making her one of the first Senators to do so. She was one of the most visible faces for his campaign, and her support was crucial to Obama's narrow victory in the Missouri primary in February 2008. She has credited her daughter Maddie as having persuaded her to publicly endorse Obama. She was frequently mentioned as a possible vice-presidential nominee for Obama, but was never seriously considered. She spoke on the opening day of the Democratic National Convention in August 2008.

2016 presidential election
In 2013, McCaskill announced that she would be supporting Hillary Clinton in the 2016 presidential election. During the primaries, McCaskill was among Clinton's top surrogates. She described Bernie Sanders as "too liberal" and "extreme" and saying that the enthusiasm of his supporters was no more impressive than that of Ron Paul's supporters in 2012. On March 21, after Clinton's sweep of Southern primaries, McCaskill called for Sanders to throw his support to Clinton.

Economic issues

In 2013, the National Journal gave her a 46% score on "Liberal on Economic Policy" and a 53% score on "Conservative on Economic Policy". In 2016, FreedomWorks and the Club for Growth, both of which support lower taxes, gave her ratings of 10% and 15%, respectively.

In November 2017, President Trump visited Missouri to promote his tax bill and said that if McCaskill didn't support his tax plan, she should be voted out of office. She said that she could support a tax bill put together "in a bipartisan way" and that she would support "doubling the standard deduction", "enhancing the child tax credit", and even "some corporate tax relief as long as we were cleaning up some of the loopholes that allow so many corporations to avoid paying their fair share." But she did not support Trump's tax bill, which in Missouri, she said, would mainly help rich St. Louis suburbanites.

Ahead of an August 7, 2018, Missouri vote on Proposition A on adopting a right-to-work law in Missouri, McCaskill endorsed a "no" vote on the proposition.

Immigration
In 2010, McCaskill voted for the DREAM Act, which would have given undocumented immigrants who entered the United States as children a pathway to citizenship provided that they fulfilled certain conditions.

In January 2018, McCaskill and three other Democratic senators were cosponsors of the Border and Port Security Act, legislation that would mandate that US Customs and Border Protection "hire, train and assign at least 500 officers per year until the number of needed positions the model identifies is filled" in addition to requiring the commissioner of Customs and Border Protection to determine potential equipment and infrastructure improvements that could be used for ports of entry.

McCaskill has said that "protecting the DREAMers has to be a very top priority." McCaskill opposed the Trump administration's policy of separating immigrant families who illegally crossed the border, and supported legislation to end the family separation policy.

Government spending
She co-sponsored the Saving Federal Dollars Through Better Use of Government Purchase and Travel Cards Act, which sought to improve the processes related to the use of credit cards by government employees.

Armed services

As a member of the Senate Armed Services Committee, McCaskill has called for nuclear weapons modernization. In June 2017, she voted to support Trump's $350 billion arms deal with Saudi Arabia.

On January 14, 2014, she introduced the Victims Protection Act of 2014 (S. 1917; 113th Congress), which seeks to help victims of sexual assault in the military. This bill was a watered down version of a similar sexual assault bill previously introduced by Senator Kirsten Gillibrand. The latter proposal would have streamlined the prosecution process by removing it from the military chain of command. McCaskills' bill allows victims to give a preference as to whether they would prefer their cases to be tried in the military or in the civilian justice system. The bill passed the Senate on March 10, 2014, by a vote of 97–0.

Disaster recovery
As a member of the Senate ad hoc subcommittee on disaster recovery, McCaskill criticized the Federal Emergency Management Agency's handling of Hurricane Katrina recovery efforts.

Health care
In 2017, the Planned Parenthood Action Fund gave her a 100% lifetime rating for her positions on health care. In 2016, the American Public Health Association also gave her a 100% rating for the positions she had taken on health-care issues during the previous year.

McCaskill voted for the Patient Protection and Affordable Care Act, popularly known as ObamaCare, in December 2009.

In April 2017, McCaskill expressed her opposition to a single-payer healthcare system, saying it is too expensive and not realistic.

In August 2017, she introduced the Health Care Options for All Act, whereby people living in counties with no health-care exchanges "would be able to buy coverage through the D.C. small business exchange, called SHOP", with the U.S. government "contribut[ing] toward the cost of premiums if they meet a certain income threshold." Criticizing Trump's health-care bill in September 2017, she called it "a bait-and-switch, in which they're trying to buy off certain states with promises of more money now, but with no guarantee that healthcare dollars in our state won't ultimately go down." She added that the bill would not help "folks in Missouri who've been sick before and have a pre-existing condition, and older Missourians."

At each event during her 2018 re-election bid campaign, McCaskill asked attendees with preexisting conditions to stand up, and vowed to keep in place health insurance protections for such individuals.

Gun law
McCaskill received an "F" rating from the National Rifle Association (NRA) for not supporting their view of Second Amendment rights and opposing all right-to-carry legislation.

She voted for expanded background checks and co-sponsored the "Feinstein Amendment," a proposal that would have made it illegal for individuals on the terror watchlist to purchase guns. In January 2016, McCaskill was one of eighteen senators to sign a letter to Thad Cochran and Barbara Mikulski requesting that the Labor, Health and Education subcommittee hold a hearing on whether to allow the Centers for Disease Control and Prevention (CDC) to fund a study of gun violence and "the annual appropriations rider that some have interpreted as preventing it" with taxpayer dollars. The senators noted their support for taking steps "to fund gun-violence research, because only the United States government is in a position to establish an integrated public-health research agenda to understand the causes of gun violence and identify the most effective strategies for prevention." In June 2016, McCaskill participated in the Chris Murphy gun control filibuster and in a sit-in on the House floor urging votes for gun control.

In response to the 2017 Las Vegas shooting, McCaskill co-sponsored a bill to ban bump stocks.

Terrorism

During a 2013 congressional hearing, McCaskill asked Homeland Security Secretary Janet Napolitano: "Based on the evidence at this point, is there any difference between Sandy Hook and Boston other than the choice of weapon?" McCaskill then urged Napolitano "to reevaluate when and how the federal government defines a criminal act as terrorism".

#MeToo
In October 2017, in the midst of a flurry of news reports about sexual assaults by politicians and other celebrities, McCaskill said on Meet the Press that while serving in the state legislature, she had asked the House Speaker, Bob F. Griffin, to discuss a bill she was sponsoring. "And I explained to him the bill I had, and did he have any advice for me on how I could get it out of committee?" McCaskill said. "And he looked at me, and he paused, and he said, 'Well, did you bring your knee pads?'"

Comments on men
In November 2015, in a video for The Late Show with Stephen Colbert, McCaskill encouraged men to "sometimes just shut the hell up." McCaskill added, "It's not that women don't value your thoughts, it's just that we don't value all of them." She then set forth a variety of topics about which "women no longer need to hear men's opinions." Regarding the topic of "what women do with their bodies", McCaskill advised men to "hush". McCaskill described the video as a joke.

LGBT rights 
On March 24, 2013, McCaskill posted to Tumblr in support of same-sex marriage: "While churches should never be required to conduct marriages outside of their religious beliefs, neither should the government tell people who they have a right to marry."

On a November 4, 2020, MSNBC broadcast, McCaskill said that by supporting issues like abortion, same-sex marriage, and the rights of transgender people, whom McCaskill referred to as "transsexuals", Democrats "left voters behind and Republicans dove in." McCaskill apologized for using the word transsexuals, which she called a "hurtful term", the next day in a tweet, saying she was "tired" but admitting that is "never a good excuse". She further said that "our party should never leave behind our fight for equality for trans people or anyone else who has been marginalized by hate", adding that "my record reflects that."

Net neutrality

In January 2018, McCaskill announced her support for a Senate bill intended to reverse the Federal Communications Commission's repeal of net neutrality; as she was the 30th Senator to support the bill, it was ensured that the bill would reach the floor of the Senate. In October 2017, McCaskill was one of four Democrats who voted to confirm FCC Commissioner Ajit Pai, who announced the plan to reverse net neutrality rules earlier that year. In explaining her vote, McCaskill said that she disagreed with Pai on net neutrality but voted for Pai because "the president has a right to the chairman because he won the election". According to Ars Technica, "it's common for [FCC] commissioners to get broad bi-partisan support in the Senate even if their policies are opposed by one of the two major parties."

Trade
McCaskill opposed Trump's trade tariffs, saying they were "hurting Missouri farmers and manufacturing."

Israel Anti-Boycott Act
In June 2017, McCaskill co-sponsored the Israel Anti-Boycott Act, Senate Bill 720, which made it a federal crime, punishable by a maximum sentence of 20 years imprisonment, for Americans to encourage or participate in internationally sponsored boycotts against Israel and Israeli settlements in the occupied Palestinian territories if protesting actions by the Israeli government.

Voting rights
In July 2018, McCaskill introduced legislation that would make it illegal to knowingly and intentionally spread false information about an election, such as false information about the time and place of voting, voter qualifications and registration status. She said, "Misinformation campaigns intended only to suppress the vote and disenfranchise Missourians are crimes that run counter to our democratic values."

Committee assignments
Committee on Armed Services
Subcommittee on Airland
Subcommittee on Cybersecurity
Subcommittee on Personnel
United States Senate Committee on Finance
United States Senate Finance Subcommittee on International Trade, Customs, and Global Competitiveness
United States Senate Finance Subcommittee on Taxation and IRS Oversight
Committee on Homeland Security and Governmental Affairs (Ranking Member)
Subcommittee on Federal Financial Management, Government Information and International Security
Permanent Subcommittee on Investigations (Ranking Member)
Ad Hoc Subcommittee on State, Local, and Private Sector Preparedness and Integration
McCaskill also served as the Chairwoman of the Select Committee for the Impeachment of Samuel B. Kent, which was disbanded July 22, 2009, after Judge Kent resigned, and the United States Senate Homeland Security Ad Hoc Subcommittee on Contracting Oversight, which was disbanded in 2013.

Controversies

Private airplane
On March 16, 2011, McCaskill told reporters that she was "embarrassed" about revelations that her office had used taxpayer money for the senator's use of a private airplane she co-owned with her husband and friends. According to a government audit, the plane was used for 90 flights taken between Washington, D.C., and her home in suburban St. Louis, as well as to numerous sites around the state of Missouri. According to McCaskill's Senate office, all but 1 of the 90 flights in question were within Senate rules. As soon as the story broke, McCaskill sent a check for $88,000 to the U.S. Treasury as reimbursement for the flights.

The Missouri Republican Party filed a formal complaint with the Senate Ethics Committee on March 16. In response McCaskill said, "The Missouri Republican Party is going to try to ride this horse as long as they can. They're going to try to make this as big a deal as they can. Them filing the ethics complaint is about as surprising as the sun coming up." On March 21, 2011, Politico reported that McCaskill and her husband had failed to pay more than $280,000 in property taxes on the plane and were planning to sell it. "I have convinced my husband to sell the damn plane", McCaskill said on a conference call with reporters. "I will never set foot on the plane again". The Ethics Committee dismissed the Missouri GOP's complaint.

The plane, a 2001 Pilatus PC-12, was sold in October 2011. It was stored at Spirit of St. Louis Airport, McCaskill confirmed, and owned by Timesaver LLC, a Delaware-based limited liability company. McCaskill noted that she had paid $38,800 in sales taxes on the plane, and she had only recently (as of March 2011) become aware that Missouri also imposed a property tax on private aircraft. She said she was "disappointed" in herself for not ensuring that Timesaver LLC paid the property taxes. "Frankly, having the plane owned in Delaware would not negate the necessity of paying the personal property tax in Missouri", she said. "This is a mistake. It should have been reported in Missouri. It was owed in Missouri. It will be paid in Missouri today".

Meetings with Russian government officials
On March 2, 2017, McCaskill tweeted that she had had "No call or meeting w/Russian ambassador. Ever". After her own tweets of January 20, 2013 ("Off to meeting w/Russian Ambassador.") and August 6, 2015 ("Today calls with British, Russian, and German Ambassadors") were exposed, McCaskill recanted her tweet of March 2, blaming Twitter's character limit. McCaskill had been a leading critic of Attorney General Jeff Sessions's meetings with Russian government officials in his capacity as United States senator and had called for Sessions's resignation on this account. McCaskill also said that the nature of her meetings with the Russian ambassador were different to his. PolitiFact rated McCaskill's assertion false, and also noted "though the context for McCaskill's and Sessions' interactions with Kislyak may be very different, she goes too far in saying she didn't 'ever' have that meeting or phone call."

Electoral history

State Auditor
She was elected Missouri State Auditor in the 1998 Missouri State Auditor election and re-elected in the 2002 Missouri State Auditor election.

Governor

Results

U.S. Senator

Career after public office
On January 15, 2019, McCaskill joined NBC News and MSNBC as a political analyst. McCaskill is featured as a regular guest on Deadline: White House and Morning Joe. She also makes frequent appearances on The Last Word with Lawrence O'Donnell and The 11th Hour with Brian Williams along with, MSNBC and NBC News Special Event Breaking News Coverage.

In May 2021, McCaskill was reportedly being considered for an ambassadorship in Europe under the Joe Biden administration.

In October 2022, McCaskill joined the Council for Responsible Social Media project launched by Issue One to address the negative mental, civic, and public health impacts of social media in the United States co-chaired by former House Democratic Caucus Leader Dick Gephardt and former Massachusetts Lieutenant Governor Kerry Healey.

Personal life

McCaskill was married to David Exposito, with whom she had three children. The couple divorced in 1995, after 11 years of marriage, while McCaskill was Jackson County Prosecutor. David Exposito was found murdered in Kansas City, Kansas on December 12, 2005. Exposito's murder has never been solved.

McCaskill married Joseph Shepard in 2002.

On the October 3, 2009, episode of Wait Wait... Don't Tell Me! on National Public Radio, McCaskill spoke about a vacation early in her career as a lawyer, where she was a contestant on High Rollers. McCaskill reigned as champion for four days, and later sold several of her prizes to pay off her student loan debt.

McCaskill's mother, Betty Anne McCaskill, died on October 29, 2012, from natural causes at the age of 84. A convert to Roman Catholicism, McCaskill was denied communion for her pro-choice stance on abortion by then-Bishop Raymond Burke, later Cardinal Raymond Burke.

McCaskill maintains residences in Washington, D.C. and Kirkwood, a suburb of St. Louis. She joined Sheryl Sandberg's movement to encourage young women to be more assertive in professional interactions. On February 22, 2016, McCaskill announced that she had been diagnosed with breast cancer. She stated through Tumblr, "It's a little scary, but my prognosis is good and I expect a full recovery."

Honors

Scholastic

 University degrees

 Chancellor, visitor, governor, rector and fellowships

Honorary degrees

Memberships and non-scholastic fellowships

Awards

See also
 Barack Obama Supreme Court candidates
 Women in the United States Senate

References

External links

|-

|-

|-

|-

|-

|-

1953 births
21st-century American politicians
21st-century American women politicians
American people of Scottish descent
American prosecutors
American women lawyers
Catholics from Missouri
Converts to Roman Catholicism from Protestantism
Democratic Party members of the Missouri House of Representatives
Democratic Party United States senators from Missouri
Female United States senators
Georgetown University alumni
Living people
Missouri lawyers
MSNBC people
NBC News people
People from Columbia, Missouri
People from Houston, Missouri
People from Kansas City, Missouri
People from Lebanon, Missouri
People from Rolla, Missouri
State Auditors of Missouri
University of Missouri School of Law alumni
Hickman High School alumni
Women state legislators in Missouri